Porfirio Feliciani (died 2 October 1634) was a Roman Catholic prelate who served as Bishop of Foligno (1612–1634).

Biography
On 2 April 1612, he was appointed during the papacy of Pope Paul V as Bishop of Foligno.
On 1 May 1612, he was consecrated bishop by Scipione Caffarelli-Borghese, Archpriest of the Arcibasilica di San Giovanni in Laterano with Fabio Biondi (bishop), Titular Patriarch of Jerusalem, and Ulpiano Volpi, Archbishop of Chieti, serving as co-consecrators. 
He served as Bishop of Foligno until his death on 2 October 1634.

References

External links and additional sources
 (for Chronology of Bishops) 
 (for Chronology of Bishops) 

17th-century Italian Roman Catholic bishops
Bishops appointed by Pope Paul V
1634 deaths
Bishops of Foligno